Lykiskos was an officer of the Makedonian Kassandros in the 4th century BCE.

Lykiskos was sent by Kassandros to Epeiros as regent and general, when the Epeirots had passed sentence of banishment against their king Aiakides of Epeiros and allied themselves with Kassandros 316 BCE.

In 314 BCE, Kassandros left him in command of a strong body of troops in Akarnania, which he had organized against the Aitolians, who favored the cause of Antigonos II Gonatas. Lykiskos was still commanding in Akarnania in 312 BCE, when he was sent with an army into Epeiros against Alketas II of Epeiros, whom he defeated. He also took the town of Eurymenai, and destroyed it.

Notes

Ancient Macedonian generals
Hellenistic generals
4th-century BC Macedonians